The 1971 St. Louis Cardinals season was the team's 90th season in St. Louis, Missouri and its 80th season in the National League. The Cardinals went 90–72 during the season and finished second in the National League East, seven games behind the eventual NL pennant and World Series champion Pittsburgh Pirates.

Offseason 
 October 5, 1970: Dick Allen was traded by the Cardinals to the Los Angeles Dodgers for Ted Sizemore and Bob Stinson.
 October 20, 1970: Carl Taylor and Jim Ellis were traded by the Cardinals to the Milwaukee Brewers for Jerry McNertney, George Lauzerique, and Jesse Huggins (minors).

Regular season 
The Cardinals scrapped their traditional buttoned jerseys for T-shirt style uniform tops, and would keep them until they switched back in 1992.

Third baseman Joe Torre won the MVP Award this year, batting .363, with 24 home runs and 137 RBIs. Pitcher Bob Gibson won a Gold Glove this year, and threw a no-hitter against the Pittsburgh Pirates on August 14.

Season standings

Record vs. opponents

Game log

|- bgcolor=#fbb
| 1 || April 6 || @ Cubs || 1–2 || Jenkins || Gibson ||  || 39,079 || 0–1
|- bgcolor=#cfc
| 2 || April 7 || @ Cubs || 14–3 || Carlton || Hands ||  || 23,287 || 1–1
|- bgcolor=#fbb
| 3 || April 10 || Giants || 4–6 || Reberger || Reuss || Johnson || 26,841 || 1–2
|- bgcolor=#cfc
| 4 || April 11 (1) || Giants || 4–2 || Gibson || Robertson ||  ||  || 2–2
|- bgcolor=#fbb
| 5 || April 11 (2) || Giants || 2–7 || Marichal || Cleveland ||  || 27,104 || 2–3
|- bgcolor=#cfc
| 6 || April 12 || Astros || 5–4 || Carlton || Blasingame || Linzy || 11,270 || 3–3
|- bgcolor=#fbb
| 7 || April 13 || Astros || 4–8 || Culver || Torrez || Lemaster || 5,105 || 3–4
|- bgcolor=#cfc
| 8 || April 14 || @ Dodgers || 7–1 || Reuss || Osteen || Linzy || 11,644 || 4–4
|- bgcolor=#fbb
| 9 || April 15 || @ Dodgers || 1–2 || Downing || Cleveland ||  || 12,632 || 4–5
|- bgcolor=#cfc
| 10 || April 16 || @ Padres || 7–1 || Gibson || Coombs ||  || 6,782 || 5–5
|- bgcolor=#cfc
| 11 || April 17 || @ Padres || 4–0 || Carlton || Phoebus ||  || 3,462 || 6–5
|- bgcolor=#cfc
| 12 || April 18 || @ Padres || 4–2 || Torrez || Ross || Linzy || 8,777 || 7–5
|- bgcolor=#fbb
| 13 || April 19 || @ Giants || 2–4 || Bryant || Reuss ||  || 3,630 || 7–6
|- bgcolor=#cfc
| 14 || April 20 || @ Giants || 2–1 || Cleveland || Marichal || Drabowsky || 9,791 || 8–6
|- bgcolor=#cfc
| 15 || April 21 || @ Giants ||5–3 || Gibson || Perry ||  || 6,178 || 9–6
|- bgcolor=#cfc
| 16 || April 22 || Phillies || 5–2 || Carlton || Bunning ||  || 8,411 || 10–6
|- bgcolor=#fbb
| 17 || April 23 || Phillies || 6–8 || Brandon || Brunet ||  || 29,290 || 10–7
|- bgcolor=#cfc
| 18 || April 24 || Phillies  || 5–0 || Reuss || Champion ||  || 17,733 || 11–7
|- bgcolor=#cfc
| 19 || April 25 || Phillies  || 5–4 || Linzy || Fryman ||  || 13,122 || 12–7
|- bgcolor=#fbb
| 20 || April 26 || Mets || 2–12 || Seaver || Gibson ||  || 20,402 || 12–8
|- bgcolor=#fbb
| 21 || April 27 || Mets || 1–2 || Koosman || Carlton || Frisella || 8,575 || 12–9
|- bgcolor=#fbb
| 22 || April 28 || Mets || 1–9 || Gentry || Torrez ||  || 8,171 || 12–10
|- bgcolor=#fbb
| 23 || April 29 || Mets || 0–7 || Ryan || Reuss || Frisella || 10,215 || 12–11
|- bgcolor=#cfc
| 24 || April 30 || Expos || 4–2 || Shaw || Raymond ||  || 10,766 || 13–11
|-

|- bgcolor=#ddd
| 25 || May 1 || Expos || 2–2 || Rain out || Tied after || 7 innings ||32,061 || 13–11
|- bgcolor=#cfc
| 26 || May 2 || Expos || 1–0 || Carlton || Morton ||  || 10,320 || 14–11
|- bgcolor=#fbb
| 27 || May 3 || @ Phillies || 2–3 || Lersch || Zachary || Hoerner || 9,102 || 14–12
|- bgcolor=#cfc
| 28 || May 4 || @ Phillies || 7–3 || Reuss || Short ||  || 9,339 || 15–12
|- bgcolor=#cfc
| 29 || May 5 || @ Phillies || 5–1 || Cleveland || Hoerner ||  || 10,184 || 16–12
|- bgcolor=#fbb
| 30 || May 7 || @ Mets || 1–3 || Seaver || Gibson ||  || 44,304 || 16–13
|- bgcolor=#fbb
| 31 || May 9 || @ Mets || 5–9 || Koosman || Carlton || Frisella || 27,189 || 16–14
|- bgcolor=#cfc
| 32 || May 10 || @ Expos || 8–5 || Reuss || Renko || Linzy || 16,703 || 17–14
|- bgcolor=#cfc
| 33 || May 11 || @ Expos || 10–4 || Cleveland || Morton || Linzy || 8,862 || 18–14
|- bgcolor=#cfc
| 34 || May 14 || @ Astros || 4–2 || Gibson || Billingham ||  || 16,437 || 19–14
|- bgcolor=#cfc
| 35 || May 15 || @ Astros || 6–5 || Carlton || Griffin || Taylor || 19,285 || 20–14
|- bgcolor=#fbb
| 36 || May 16 || @ Astros || 4–12 || Dierker || Reuss || Ray || 14,983 || 20–15
|- bgcolor=#cfc
| 37 || May 18 || Dodgers || 6–5 || Drabowsky|| Brewer ||  || 14,753 || 21–15
|- bgcolor=#fbb
| 38 || May 19 || Dodgers || 5–6 || Mikkelsen || Gibson ||  || 13,869 || 21–16
|- bgcolor=#cfc
| 39 || May 20 || Dodgers || 5–0 || Carlton || Singer ||  || 11,875 || 22–16
|- bgcolor=#cfc
| 40 || May 21 || Padres || 15–8 || Shaw || Laxton || Drabowsky || 27,298 || 23–16
|- bgcolor=#cfc
| 41 || May 22 || Padres || 7–4 || Zachary || Roberts || Shaw || 10,776 || 24–16
|- bgcolor=#cfc
| 42 || May 23 || Padres || 6–1 || Cleveland || Arlin ||  || 9,475 || 25–16
|- bgcolor=#fbb
| 43 || May 24 || Padres || 3–12 || Phoebus || Gibson || Miller || 8,609 || 25–17
|- bgcolor=#cfc
| 44 || May 25 || Cubs || 4–2 || Carlton || Hands ||  || 12,667 || 26–17
|- bgcolor=#cfc
| 45 || May 26 || Cubs || 9–4 || Taylor || Holtzman ||  || 12,690 || 27–17
|- bgcolor=#cfc
| 46 || May 27 || Cubs || 10–0 || Zachary || Jenkins ||  || 14,167 || 28–17
|- bgcolor=#cfc
| 47 || May 28 || Braves || 4–0 || Cleveland || Reed ||  || 14,537 || 29–17
|- bgcolor=#cfc
| 48 || May 29 || Braves || 8–7 || Drabowsky || Upshaw ||  || 47,598 || 30–17
|- bgcolor=#cfc
| 49 || May 30 || Braves || 8–3 || Carlton || P. Niekro ||  || 24,380 || 31–17
|- bgcolor=#cfc
| 50 || May 31 || Braves || 3–2 || Reuss || Stone ||  || 20,349 || 32–17
|-

|- bgcolor=#fbb
| 51 || June 1 || @ Pirates || 0–9 || Ellis (7–3) || Zachary (2–2) ||  || 21,516 || 32–18
|- bgcolor=#fbb
| 52 || June 2 || @ Pirates || 1–10 || Walker (2–6) || Cleveland (5–3) || Veale (1) || 9,612 || 32–19
|- bgcolor=#cfc
| 53 || June 3 || @ Pirates || 7–1 || Carlton (10–2) || Johnson (4–4) ||  || 18,947 || 33–19
|- bgcolor=#fbb
| 54 || June 4 || @ Reds || 0–12 || Grimsley (3–1) || Zachary (2–3) ||  || 17,120 || 33–20
|- bgcolor=#cfc
| 55 || June 5 || @ Reds || 5–3 || Reuss (6–4) || Cloninger (2–4) || Drabowsky (3) || 18,144 || 34–20
|- bgcolor=#fbb
| 56 || June 6 || @ Reds || 2–4 || Gullett (6–2) || Cleveland (5–4) || Gibbon (5) || 20,189 || 34–21
|- bgcolor=#cfc
| 57 || June 7 || @ Braves || 7–6 || Drabowsky (3–0) || Priddy (2–2) ||  || 10,354 || 35–21
|- bgcolor=#fbb
| 58 || June 8 || @ Braves || 7–8 || Upshaw (7–4) || Linzy (1–1) ||  || 8,518 || 35–22
|- bgcolor=#fbb
| 59 || June 9 || @ Braves || 3–8 || P. Niekro (4–6) || Zachary (2–4) ||  || 7,506 || 35–23
|- bgcolor=#fbb
| 60 || June 10 || Pirates || 1–3 || Blass (6–3) || Reuss (6–5) ||  || 18,950 || 35–24
|- bgcolor=#fbb
| 61 || June 11 || Pirates || 4–11 || Ellis (9–3) || Cleveland (5–5) || Giusti (13) || 27,308 || 35–25
|- bgcolor=#fbb
| 62 || June 12 || Pirates || 3–4 || Grant (4–2) || Arroyo (0–1) ||  || 24,565 || 35–26
|- bgcolor=#fbb
| 63 || June 13 || Pirates || 4–8 || Giusti (2–1) || Carlton (10–3) || Hernández (1) || 21,205 || 35–27
|- bgcolor=#fbb
| 64 || June 14	|| Reds || 2–7 || Grimsley (4–1) || Reuss (6–6) || Carroll (7) || 18,613 || 35–28
|- bgcolor=#cfc
| 65 || June 15	|| Reds || 6–1 || Cleveland (6–5) || Merritt (0–8) ||  || 19,514 || 36–28
|- bgcolor=#fbb
| 66 || June 16	|| Reds || 0–1 || Gullett (7–2) || Santorini (0–3) ||  || 19,232 || 36–29
|- bgcolor=#fbb
| 67 || June 17 || @ Cubs || 6–7 || Bonham (1–1) || Zachary (2–5) ||  || 22,749 || 36–30
|- bgcolor=#fbb
| 68 || June 18 || @ Cubs || 5–15 || Pappas (7–6) || Reuss (6–7) || Regan (2) || 23,540 || 36–31
|- bgcolor=#fbb
| 69 || June 19 || @ Cubs || 1–7 || Hands (8–8) || Cleveland (6–6) ||  || 32,809 || 36–32
|- bgcolor=#cfc
| 70 || June 20 || @ Cubs || 5–4 || Drabowsky (4–0) || Holtzman (6–8) ||  || 34,574 || 37–32
|- bgcolor=#fbb
| 71 || June 21 || @ Dodgers || 0–4 || O'Brien (2–1) || Gibson (4–6) ||  || 18,480 || 37–33
|- bgcolor=#cfc
| 72 || June 22 || @ Dodgers || 6–5 || Carlton (11–3) || Osteen (8–5) ||  || 21,004 || 38–33
|- bgcolor=#cfc
| 73 || June 23 || @ Dodgers || 3–1 || Drabowsky (5–0) || Brewer (3–2) || Shaw (2) || 19,910 || 39–33
|- bgcolor=#fbb
| 74 || June 24 || @ Dodgers || 4–11 || Downing (8–4) || Cleveland (6–7) || Peña (1) || 19,282 || 39–34
|- bgcolor=#fbb
| 75 || June 25 || Cubs || 0–12 || Bonham (2–1) || Santorini (0–4) ||  || 28,743 || 39–35
|- bgcolor=#fbb
| 76 || June 26 || Cubs || 1–5 || Holtzman (7–8) || Gibson (4–7) ||  || 43,300 || 39–36
|- bgcolor=#fbb
| 77 || June 27 || Cubs || 1–4 || Jenkins (11–7) || Carlton (11–4) ||  || 34,964 || 39–37
|- bgcolor=#fbb
| 78 || June 28 || Pirates || 5–11 || Moose (6–4) || Reuss (6–8) || Grant (7) || 15,024 || 39–38
|- bgcolor=#cfc
| 79 || June 29 || Pirates || 8–3 || Cleveland (7–7) || Walker (3–7) ||  || 14,586 || 40–38
|-

|- bgcolor=#fbb
| 80 || July 1 || @ Giants || 7–8 || McMahon || Zachary || Johnson || 7,794 || 40–39
|- bgcolor=#cfc
| 81 || July 2 || @ Giants || 7–2 || Gibson || Stone ||  || 11,268 || 41–39
|- bgcolor=#fbb
| 82 || July 3 || @ Giants || 1–10 || Cumberland || Carlton ||  || 24,896 || 41-40
|- bgcolor=#cfc
| 83 || July 4 || @ Padres || 3–2 || Reuss || Arlin || Drabowsky || 5,095 || 42–40
|- bgcolor=#fbb
| 84 || July 5 || @ Padres || 2–3 || Miller || Cleveland ||  || 4,588 || 42–41
|- bgcolor=#fbb
| 85 || July 7 || @ Padres || 1–4 || Kirby || Gibson ||  || 7,456 || 42–42
|- bgcolor=#cfc
| 86 || July 9 (1) || Astros || 5–2 || Carlton || Forsch ||  ||  || 43–42
|- bgcolor=#cfc
| 87 || July 9 (2) || Astros || 9–5 || Reuss || Blasingame || Drabowsky || 24,748 || 44–42
|- bgcolor=#cfc
| 88 || July 10 || Astros || 6–5 || Linzy || Gladding ||  || 32,895 || 45–42
|- bgcolor=#cfc
| 89 || July 11 || Astros || 7–3 || Gibson || Ray ||  || 15,252 || 46–42
|- bgcolor=#cfc
| 90 || July 15 (1) || Expos || 7–3 || Carlton || Strohmayer ||  ||  || 47–42
|- bgcolor=#fbb
| 91 || July 15 (2) || Expos || 4–6 || Stoneman || Reuss ||  || 19,409 || 47–43
|- bgcolor=#cfc
| 92 || July 16 || Expos || 6–0 || Cleveland || Renko ||  || 23,765 || 48–43
|- bgcolor=#fbb
| 93 || July 17 || Expos || 3–5 || McAnally || Gibson ||  || 22,791 || 48–44
|- bgcolor=#cfc
| 94 || July 18 || Mets || 8–5 || Taylor || Matlack || Linzy || 27,497 || 49–44
|- bgcolor=#fbb
| 95 || July 19 || Mets || 2–5 || Sadecki || Carlton ||  || 20,003 || 49–45
|- bgcolor=#fbb
| 96 || July 20 || Phillies || 1–5 || Short || Reuss ||  || 14,650 || 49–46
|- bgcolor=#cfc
| 97 || July 21 || Phillies || 6–1 || Cleveland || Lersch ||  || 16,200 || 50–46
|- bgcolor=#cfc
| 98 || July 22 || Phillies || 8–0 || Gibson || Fryman ||  || 20,547 || 51–46
|- bgcolor=#cfc
| 99 || July 23	|| @ Expos || 6–2 || Zachary || McGinn ||  || 20,480|| 52–46
|- bgcolor=#cfc
| 100 || July 24 (1) || @ Expos || 8–7 || Shaw || Raymond ||  ||  || 53–46
|- bgcolor=#cfc
| 101 || July 24 (2) || @ Expos || 9–3 || Reuss || Morton ||  || 24,109 || 54–46
|- bgcolor=#fbb
| 102 || July 25 || @ Expos || 4–5 || Stoneman || Cleveland ||  || 20,346 || 54–47
|- bgcolor=#cfc
| 103 || July 26 || @ Mets || 4–0 || Gibson || Sadecki ||  || 30,586 || 55–47
|- bgcolor=#fbb
| 104 || July 27 || @ Mets || 2–3 || Frisella || Zachary ||  || 35,597 || 55–48
|- bgcolor=#cfc
| 105 || July 28 || @ Mets || 6–3 || Carlton || Matlack ||  || 30,796 || 56–48
|- bgcolor=#cfc
| 106 || July 29 || @ Mets || 3–1 || Reuss || C. Williams ||  || 30,254 || 57–48
|- bgcolor=#cfc
| 107 || July 30 || @ Phillies || 4–3 || Gibson || Short ||  || 26,461 || 58–48
|- bgcolor=#fbb
| 108 || July 31 || @ Phillies || 4–5 || Brandon || Drabowsky ||  || 19,269 || 58–49
|-

|- bgcolor=#cfc
| 109 || August 1 || @ Phillies || 9–6 || S. Williams || Muñiz ||  || 22,432 || 59–49
|- bgcolor=#cfc
| 110 || August 2 || Padres || 3–1 || Carlton || Roberts ||  || 13,591 || 60–49
|- bgcolor=#fbb
| 111 || August 3 || Padres || 1–6 || Arlin || Reuss ||  || 14,246 || 60–50
|- bgcolor=#cfc
| 112 || August 4 || Giants || 7–2 || Gibson || Perry ||  || 27,024 || 61–50
|- bgcolor=#cfc
| 113 || August 5 || Giants || 3–2 || Cleveland || Marichal || Drabowsky || 18,641 || 62–50
|- bgcolor=#cfc
| 114 || August 6 || Giants || 12–8 || Shaw || McMahon || Patterson || 27,192 ||63–50
|- bgcolor=#cfc
| 115 || August 7 || Dodgers || 3–2 || Linzy || Mikkelsen ||  || 36,633|| 64–50
|- bgcolor=#fbb
| 116 || August 8 || Dodgers || 2–4 || Sutton || Reuss || Brewer || 45,195 || 64–51
|- bgcolor=#fbb
| 117 || August 9 || Dodgers || 5–6 || Downing || Gibson || Brewer || 26,723 || 64–52
|- bgcolor=#fbb
| 118 || August 10 || Braves || 1–2 || Stone || Cleveland || Upshaw || 20,921 || 64–53
|- bgcolor=#fbb
| 119 || August 11 || Braves || 3–9 || Kelley || Zachary || McQueen || 21,906 || 64–54
|- bgcolor=#cfc
| 120 || August 12 || @ Pirates || 3–2 || Carlton || Walker ||  || 21,805 || 65–54
|- bgcolor=#cfc
| 121 || August 13 || @ Pirates || 2–0 || Reuss || Blass ||  || 31,563 || 66–54
|- bgcolor=#cfc
| 122 || August 14 || @ Pirates || 11–0 || Gibson || Johnson ||  || 30,678 || 67–54
|- bgcolor=#cfc
| 123 || August 15 || @ Pirates || 6–4 || Linzy || Miller || Drabowsky || 49,329 || 68–54
|- bgcolor=#fbb
| 124 || August 16 || @ Reds || 5–6 || Carroll || Linzy ||  || 13,259 || 68–55
|- bgcolor=#fbb
| 125 || August 17 || @ Reds || 3–5 || Granger || Taylor ||  || 14,578 || 68–56
|- bgcolor=#fbb
| 126 || August 18 || @ Reds || 0–5 || Gullett || Gibson ||  || 28,228 || 68–57
|- bgcolor=#fbb
| 127 || August 20 || @ Braves || 5–6 || Barber || Shaw ||  || 16,099 || 68–58
|- bgcolor=#fbb
| 128 || August 21 || @ Braves || 5–8 || Stone || Carlton ||  || 22,451 || 68–59
|- bgcolor=#cfc
| 129 || August 22 || @ Braves || 13–4 || Reuss || Reed || Taylor || 19,650 || 69–59
|- bgcolor=#cfc
| 130 || August 23 || @ Astros || 3–2 || Gibson || Wilson ||  || 19,167 || 70–59
|- bgcolor=#cfc
| 131 || August 24 || @ Astros || 2–1 || Cleveland || Forsch || Santorini || 13,860 || 71–59
|- bgcolor=#cfc
| 132 || August 25 || @ Astros || 4–1 || Carlton || Cook ||  || 11,025 || 72–59
|- bgcolor=#fbb
| 133 || August 27 || Reds || 7–8 || Granger || Linzy || Gibbon || 33,273 || 72–60
|- bgcolor=#cfc
| 134 || August 28 || Reds || 4–0 || Gibson || Nolan ||  || 40,823 || 73–60
|- bgcolor=#cfc
| 135 || August 29 || Reds || 4–3 || Shaw || Granger ||  || 28,624 || 74–60
|- bgcolor=#cfc
| 136 || August 30 || Mets || 3–2 || Carlton || Koosman ||  || 15,257 || 75–60
|- bgcolor=#cfc
| 137 || August 31 || Mets || 2–1 || Reuss || Frisella ||  || 15,854 || 76–60
|-

|- bgcolor=#fbb
| 138 || September 1 || Mets || 1–7 || Seaver || Gibson ||  || 22,204 || 76–61
|- bgcolor=#cfc
| 139 || September 3 || Cubs || 6–1 || Cleveland || Hands ||  || 26,708 || 77–61
|- bgcolor=#fbb
| 140 || September 4 || Cubs || 5–7 || Pappas || Carlton || Regan || 31,807 || 77–62
|- bgcolor=#cfc
| 141 || September 5 || Cubs || 12–5 || Reuss || Jenkins || Taylor || 39,309 || 78–62
|- bgcolor=#cfc
| 142 || September 6 (1) || @ Phillies || 6–3 || Gibson || Wise ||  ||  || 79–62
|- bgcolor=#fbb
| 143 || September 6 (2) || @ Phillies || 1–2 || Champion || Zachary || Hoerner || 13,193 || 79–63
|- bgcolor=#cfc
| 144 || September 7 || @ Phillies || 7–5 || Shaw || Wilson || Santorini || 9,339 || 80–63
|- bgcolor=#cfc
| 145 || September 10 || @ Cubs || 8–7 || S. Williams || Colborn ||  || 6,792 ||81–63
|- bgcolor=#fbb
| 146 || September 11 || @ Cubs || 0–7 || Pizarro || Reuss ||  || 24,010 || 81–64
|- bgcolor=#cfc
| 147 || September 12 || @ Cubs || 4–0 || Gibson || Holtzman ||  || 24,017 || 82–64
|- bgcolor=#fbb
| 148 || September 13 || Phillies || 5–6 || Wilson || Shaw ||  || 13,863 || 82–65
|- bgcolor=#fbb
| 149 || September 14 || Phillies || 4–5 || Wise || Zachary || Short || 10,640 || 82–66
|- bgcolor=#fbb
| 150 || September 15 || @ Pirates || 1–4 || Ellis || Carlton || Hernández || 21,751 || 82–67
|- bgcolor=#fbb
| 151 || September 16 || @ Pirates || 1–6 || Walker || Reuss || Hernández || 18,127 || 82–68
|- bgcolor=#cfc
| 152 || September 17 || @ Expos || 7–2 || Gibson || Morton ||  || 13,371 || 83–68
|- bgcolor=#fbb
| 153 || September 18 || @ Expos || 2–4 || Stoneman || Cleveland ||  || 16,779 || 83–69
|- bgcolor=#cfc
| 154 || September 19 || @ Expos || 11–0 || Carlton || McAnally ||  || 25,769 || 84–69
|- bgcolor=#cfc
| 155 || September 21 || Pirates || 6–4 || Drabowsky || Ellis ||  || 13,348 || 85–69
|- bgcolor=#fbb
| 156 || September 22 || Pirates || 1–5 || Walker || Gibson || Giusti || 14,845 || 85–70
|- bgcolor=#fbb
| 157 || September 23 || Pirates || 0–5 || Briles || Cleveland ||  || 10,918 || 85–71
|- bgcolor=#cfc
| 158 || September 24 || Expos || 10–6 || Taylor || Marshall ||  || 8,109 || 86–71
|- bgcolor=#cfc
| 159 || September 25 || Expos || 8–6 || Shaw || Morton ||  || 9,114 || 87–71
|- bgcolor=#cfc
| 160 || September 26 || Expos || 7–1 || Higgins || Stoneman ||  || 11,473 || 88–71
|- bgcolor=#cfc
| 161 || September 27 || @ Mets || 6–1 || S. Williams || Capra || Drabowsky || 11,331 || 89–71
|- bgcolor=#cfc
| 162 || September 28 || @ Mets || 5–2 || Carlton || Ryan ||  || 3,338 || 90–71
|- bgcolor=#fbb
| 163 || September 30 || @ Mets || 1–6 || Seaver || Patterson ||  || 42,344 || 90–72
|-

Opening Day starters 
Matty Alou
Lou Brock
José Cardenal
Joe Hague
Julián Javier
Jerry Reuss
Ted Simmons
Ted Sizemore
Joe Torre

Notable transactions 
 June 8, 1971: Keith Hernandez was drafted by the Cardinals in the 42nd round of the 1971 Major League Baseball Draft.
 June 11, 1971: Leron Lee and Fred Norman were traded by the Cardinals to the San Diego Padres for Al Santorini.
 June 15, 1971: Mike Torrez was traded by the Cardinals to the Montreal Expos for Bob Reynolds.

Roster

Player stats

Batting

Starters by position 
Note: Pos = Position; G = Games played; AB = At bats; H = Hits; Avg. = Batting average; HR = Home runs; RBI = Runs batted in

Other batters 
Note: G = Games played; AB = At bats; H = Hits; Avg. = Batting average; HR = Home runs; RBI = Runs batted in

Pitching

Starting pitchers 
Note: G = Games pitched; IP = Innings pitched; W = Wins; L = Losses; ERA = Earned run average; SO = Strikeouts

Other pitchers 
Note: G = Games pitched; IP = Innings pitched; W = Wins; L = Losses; ERA = Earned run average; SO = Strikeouts

Relief pitchers 
Note: G = Games pitched; W = Wins; L = Losses; SV = Saves; ERA = Earned run average; SO = Strikeouts

Awards and honors 
 Lou Brock, National League Stolen Base Leader, 64 
 Joe Torre, National League Most Valuable Player
 Joe Torre, Hutch Award

Farm system 

LEAGUE CHAMPIONS: Arkansas

References

External links
1971 St. Louis Cardinals at Baseball Reference
1971 St. Louis Cardinals team page at www.baseball-almanac.com

St. Louis Cardinals seasons
Saint Louis Cardinals season
St Louis